Ushakovo is a rural locality (a village) in Piksimovskoye Rural Settlement, Vashkinsky District, Vologda Oblast, Russia. The population was 10 as of 2002.

Geography 
The distance to Lipin Bor is 36 km, to Piksimovo is 4 km. Isakovo is the nearest rural locality.

References 

Rural localities in Vashkinsky District